West Cove is a summer village in Alberta, Canada. It is located on the southern shore of Lac Ste. Anne.

Demographics 

In the 2016 Census of Population conducted by Statistics Canada, the Summer Village of West Cove had a population of 149 living in 78 of its 214 total private dwellings, a  change from its 2011 population of 121.

See also 
List of communities in Alberta
List of summer villages in Alberta
List of resort villages in Saskatchewan

References

External links 

1963 establishments in Alberta
Lac Ste. Anne County
Summer villages in Alberta